Lifeway Christian Resources, based in Nashville, Tennessee, is the Christian media publishing and distribution division of the Southern Baptist Convention and provider of church business services. Until the end of their physical retail presence in 2019 it was best known for its brick and mortar LifeWay Christian Stores, one of the two major American retailers of Christian books and products (the other being Mardel Christian & Education). Lifeway produces multiple curriculums and Bible studies used in Sunday schools and other church functions. Lifeway publishes the Christian Standard Bible (the successor to the Holman Christian Standard Bible) as well as Christian books and commentaries through B&H Publishing. Lifeway operates a research division that studies Protestant trends and provides contract research services. In addition they distribute many Christian resources created by outside parties. They distribute and sell many church products such as communion supplies, upholstery etc. through its e-commerce business.  Lifeway also provides a multitude of church business services such as website design, architecture, background checks, capital campaigns, pastoral coaching and others through both in-house services and partnerships with outside firms.

While Lifeway is a non-profit and part of the Southern Baptist Convention, it receives no church funding through the cooperative program. Instead, Lifeway is self-funded through the sales of its products.

Lifeway previously operated World Changers until it was shut down in 2020 due to the coronavirus pandemic. In April 2020 Lifeway board voted to put the Ridgecrest Conference Center up for sale.

History
In 1891 James Marion Frost, a 43-year-old pastor, founded "The Sunday School Board of the Southern Baptist Convention" after that year's annual meeting in Birmingham, Alabama. In 1925, the Board began operating retail bookstores under the name "Baptist Book Store". According to Jeffrey Gros, the Sunday School Board was "one of the principal sources of literacy across the South."

Around 1971 the Board began using the "LifeWay" imprint on some of its materials and as the name for retail stores in certain markets, reflecting an expansion of items sold which included items produced by others (some of whom were not Southern Baptist). Over a two-year period from 1996 to 1998 the Board re-branded its stores under the LifeWay banner and officially changed its name.

In 2002, LifeWay acquired Serendipity House, a publisher of bible studies for small groups.

In 2017 Lifeway staff moved out of the Draper Tower and the Sullivan Tower into new headquarters in the Capitol View (Nashville) area. In 2021 it was announced the building would be sold in favor of a smaller office as the workforce continues the trend of remote working.

In January 2019 Lifeway announced it would cut staff and close some of its 170 stores; however, two months later it announced that it would be closing all of them and shift its focus to the e-commerce side of the business.

In January 2021 Lifeway unveiled a new logo, lowercasing the w in their name.

Divisions

Church ministries

Publishing

B&H Publishing 
B&H is the primary publishing of Lifeway Christian Resources. B&H traces its publishing history to 1863, when the Sunday School Board was formed in 1863 at the Southern Baptist Theological Seminary in Greenville, South Carolina. Some of its first leaders were John Albert Broadus and Basil Manly Jr. The first board and its publishing activities were absorbed by the Home Mission Board in 1873. The new Sunday School Board took over the publishing operations in 1891. By 1960, the board was using the Broadman imprint.

In 1979, the Sunday School Board acquired bible publisher A. J. Holman from J. B. Lippincott & Co. Holman started by acquiring the publishing activities of the Sower family. In 1993, the Holman Bible Company and Broadman Press merged to become Broadman & Holman. Broadman & Holman name was shortened to B&H.

B&H currently publishes under several imprints including flagship B&H Books (also called B&H Publishing), B&H Academic, B&H Kids, B&H Español and Holman Bible Publishers. The CSB Bible as well as several commentaries are published under Holman Bible Publishers. B&H Academic develops textbooks, educational resources and market-oriented works of biblical scholars, theologians and Christian academics.

Church resources

Lifeway Research 
Lifeway Research is the research division of Lifeway, conducting polls on trends with Protestantism and Evangelicalism in North America. Lifeway partners with Outreach Magazine to produce the Outreach 100- a report publicizing the 100 largest churches by attendance and by growth in the United States. Lifeway Research conducts a variety of polls on surveys on topics such as church attendance, church member's behaviors, public opinion on social issues, pastoral trends and other issues of pertinence to Christianity's influence in North America. They publish their research findings through their website and through collaboration with multiple partners. They also publish Facts and Trends, a publication highlighting research specifically targeted towards pastors and ministry leaders. Additionally, they publish several books, podcasts and other resources disseminating their research finds. Lifeway Research offers custom research services for churches, parachurch organizations and ministries.

Lifeway Research has also developed several assessments used by Southern Baptist churches among others, designed to assess church member's spiritual growth, potential church revitalization efforts and church planting.

Former divisions

World Changers 
World Changers was an organization that was an entity of LifeWay Student Ministries. It provides national youth work projects. During projects, students typically spend one week repairing damaged homes. The missions agency for World Changers was the North American Mission Board until 2011 when LifeWay took over.

The organization's first service projects began in the summer of 1990. The host-city of the first project was Briceville, TN. In 1992, World Changers expanded abroad with a project in Ciudad Victoria, Mexico. For each project, youth and adults provided labor at their own expense for substandard homes. All participants were divided into crews for the week. At each work site crews usually painted, reroofed, or performed other light construction jobs. 
In January 2011, high school and college students volunteers of World Changers returned to Rock Hill, South Carolina to continue to help substantially by improving homes in need throughout the city. World Changers was planning to recruit as many as 350 volunteers and help as many as 33 homes in Rock Hill that year.

In 2020, due to the coronavirus pandemic World Changers ceased operations.

Sales policy 
Although Lifeway sells products created by non-SBC persons and entities, generally speaking its products feature Christian teachings from a conservative perspective (consistent with the 2000 Baptist Faith & Message). It will not sell, and will if needed discontinue selling, works by authors who disagree with its policies. As an example, in October 2016 it pulled all works by author Jen Hatmaker after she endorsed same-sex marriage.

Lifeway's ministry on the subject of sexuality and gender expression categorizes non-heterosexual identities as sinful lifestyles, the 'threat' of which requires church members be "ready when homosexuality devastates." This is generally consistent with Article XVIII of the Baptist Faith & Message (the doctrinal statement of the Southern Baptist Convention, LifeWay's parent), though it does not specifically address gender expression topics such as transgender and non-binary gender identities.

Leadership
In February 2006, Thom Rainer became the president and CEO of LifeWay after having served as dean of the Billy Graham School of Evangelism of the Southern Baptist Theological Seminary. He succeeded James T. Draper, Jr., of the Fort Worth metro area, who had headed LifeWay from 1991 to 2006.

On August 29, 2018, Rainer announced his retirement from LifeWay effective within one year or once his replacement had been identified—whichever occurred first. Rainer resigned earlier than anticipated on February 28, 2019, and Brad Waggoner was named acting president. Ben Mandrell, a Southern Baptist pastor who had led churches in Tennessee and Colorado, was elected the 10th president and CEO of LifeWay in June, 2019.

Notes

Explanatory notes

Citations

External links

 

Christian mass media companies
Southern Baptist Convention
Companies based in Nashville, Tennessee
Baptist organizations established in the 19th century
Baptist Christianity in Tennessee
1891 establishments in Tennessee
Publishing companies established in 1891
Retail companies established in 1891